Rajiv Kumar "Raju" Rai (born February 3, 1983, in Lawrenceville, Georgia) is an American badminton player of Indian descent. He won a bronze medal, along with his partner Mesinee Mangkalakiri, in the mixed doubles at the 2003 Pan American Games in Santo Domingo, Dominican Republic. Rai is also a member of Orange County Badminton Club in Anaheim, California, and is coached and trained by former Olympic doubles champion Tony Gunawan (2000), who is currently playing for the United States.

Rai qualified for the men's singles at the 2008 Summer Olympics in Beijing, after he was ranked sixty-eighth in the world, and awarded an entry as one of the top 38 seeded players by the Badminton World Federation. He received a bye for the second preliminary round before losing out to Finland's Ville Lång, with a score of 9–21 and 16–21.

Rai is a former coach of Bellevue Badminton Club, and also, an athlete director for the U.S. national badminton team. He, along with fellow Olympian Bob Malaythong, currently coach the top junior players in the United States at Synergy Badminton Academy in Menlo Park, California.

Achievements

Pan American Games 
Mixed doubles

Pan Am Championships
Men's singles

Men's doubles

BWF Grand Prix 
The BWF Grand Prix has two level such as Grand Prix and Grand Prix Gold. It is a series of badminton tournaments, sanctioned by Badminton World Federation (BWF) since 2007.

Men's doubles

 BWF Grand Prix Gold tournament
 BWF Grand Prix tournament

BWF International Challenge/Series
Men's singles

Men's doubles

Mixed doubles

 BWF International Challenge tournament
 BWF International Series tournament
 BWF Future Series tournament

References

External links

NBC 2008 Olympics profile

1983 births
Living people
American sportspeople of Indian descent
People from Lawrenceville, Georgia
Sportspeople from the Atlanta metropolitan area
American male badminton players
Badminton players at the 2008 Summer Olympics
Olympic badminton players of the United States
Badminton players at the 2003 Pan American Games
Pan American Games bronze medalists for the United States
Pan American Games medalists in badminton
Medalists at the 2003 Pan American Games